The Good Cop may refer to:

 The Good Cop (American TV series)
 The Good Cop (Israeli TV series)
 Good Cop, a BBC TV series

See also
 One Good Cop
 Good cop/bad cop